Fossarina petterdi is a species of very small sea snail, a marine gastropod mollusc or micromollusk in the family Trochidae, the top snails.

Description
The shell grows to a length of 4 mm. The shell is narrowly umbilicated, faintly spirally striate, with hardly visible longitudinal striae. It is dark purplish black, with a few irregular white markings. The three whorls are convex. The body whorl is large and rounded. The umbilical region is white. The interior is greenish black, showing the external white markings.  The thin, horny operculum is multispiral.

Distribution 
This marine species is endemic to Australia and occurs off South Australia, Tasmania and Victoria

References

 Crosse, H. 1870. Diagnoses Molluscorum novorum. Journal de Conchyliologie 18: 301-304
 Crosse, H. 1871. Descriptions d'espèces nouvelles. Journal de Conchyliologie 3 19: 319-325
 Tenison-Woods, J.E. 1876. Description of new Tasmanian shells. Papers and Proceedings of the Royal Society of Tasmania 1875: 134-162
 Hutton, F.W. 1882. Note on Fossaria petterdi Brazier. Proceedings of the Linnean Society of New South Wales 7: 66-67
 Hutton, F.W. 1884. Revision of the recent Rhipidoglossate and Docoglossate Mollusca of New Zealand. Proceedings of the Linnean Society of New South Wales 9: 354-378
 Pritchard, G.B. & Gatliff, J.H. 1902. Catalogue of the marine shells of Victoria. Part V. Proceedings of the Royal Society of Victoria 14(2): 85-138
 May, W.L. 1921. A Checklist of the Mollusca of Tasmania. Hobart, Tasmania : Government Printer 114 pp
 May, W.L. 1923. An Illustrated Index of Tasmanian Shells. Hobart : Government Printer 100 pp.
 Singleton, F.A. 1937. Lady Julia Percy Island. 1935 Expedition. Mollusca. Proceedings of the Royal Society of Victoria 49: 387-396
 Cotton, B.C. 1959. South Australian Mollusca. Archaeogastropoda. Handbook of the Flora and Fauna of South Australia. Adelaide : South Australian Government Printer 449 pp
Wilson, B. 1993. Australian Marine Shells. Prosobranch Gastropods. Kallaroo, Western Australia : Odyssey Publishing Vol. 1 408 pp.

External links

petterdi
Gastropods of Australia
Gastropods described in 1870